This is a list of flag bearers who have represented Kazakhstan at the Olympics.

Flag bearers carry the national flag of their country at the opening ceremony of the Olympic Games.

See also
Kazakhstan at the Olympics

References

Kazakhstan at the Olympics
Kazakhstan
Olympic flag bearers